Andy Whittaker is the founder of the British film distributor Dogwoof, which focuses on films about social issues and documentaries, such as Food, Inc. and Burma VJ.

On 24 September 2010, The Guardian published a one-off Film Power 100 list, on which Whittaker was ranked the 86th most influential figure on British cinema audiences.

In 2015 he was included in the Evening Standard Progress 1000 list, for 'London's most influential people 2015 - Film'.

References

External links
The 2010 Guardian Film Power 100
Evening Standard Progress 1000
Brands set sights on big screen ambitions
New movie distribution methods explored at Dubai International Film Festival
Hot Docs Engage My Film panel
Distribution labels focused on social climbing
Dogwoof

Film distributors (people)
Living people
Year of birth missing (living people)